Rupert W.M. Huber (born 1967 in Mödling, Austria) is an Austrian composer and musician.

In 1994, Huber founded Huber Musik to publish his own music, and in the same year, founded Tosca with Richard Dorfmeister. Huber's 2006 release of Fuck Dub Remixes CD was also created in collaboration with Dorfmeister.

Huber's works have been commissioned, amongst others, by Centre Pompidou, Wiener Festwochen, and Ars Electronica. He lives in Vienna and Berlin.

References
Bio, worklist, and statements, partly in English
Short bio
Official website

1967 births
Living people
Austrian male composers
Austrian male musicians
People from Mödling